Hartmann is a Germanic and Ashkenazi Jewish surname. It is less frequently used as a male given name. The name originates from the Germanic word, "hart", which translates in English to "hardy", "hard", or "tough" and "Mann", a suffix meaning "man", "person", or "husband".  The name Hartman, distinguished by ending with a single "n", is generally the result of the anglicisation of names that occurred with the emigration of persons from German-speaking to anglophone nations in the 18th, 19th and early 20th century. Below is a list of notable individuals and fictional characters with the surname or given name of Hartmann.

Arts and media
 Hartmann von Aue (c. 1170 – c. 1210) German poet
 Lukas Hartmann (1944), Swiss novelist and children's literature writer
 Manoah Hartmann, contestant on Canadian Idol (season 2)
 Moritz Hartmann (1821–1872), German Jewish poet
 Oluf Hartmann (1879–1910), Danish painter
 Petra Hartmann (b 1970), German author and literature scientist
 Sadakichi Hartmann (1867–1944), German-Japanese art critic long resident in America
 Sieglinde Hartmann (b 1954),  German medievalist, expert on the medieval poet Oswald von Wolkenstein 
 Thom Hartmann (b 1951), American radio host, author and commentator
 Viktor Hartmann (1834–1873), Russian architect and painter
 Bodil Neergaard née Hartmann (1867–1959), Danish estate owner, philanthropist and memoirist.
Mr. Hartman also has a friend who has a city named after himself.

Music
 Emil Hartmann (1836–1898), Danish composer, eldest son of Johan Peter Emilius Hartmann and brother-in-law to Niels Gade and August Winding
 Erich Hartmann (1920–2020), German double bass player and composer
 Georges Hartmann (1843–1900), French music publisher and librettist under the pen name Henri Grémont
 Hartmann von An der Lan-Hochbrunn (Father Hartmann) (1863–1914), Austrian composer
 Johan Peter Emilius Hartmann (1805–1900), Danish composer and organist
 John Hartmann (1830–1897), bandmaster to the Duke of Cambridge, Prussian brass composer
 Karl Amadeus Hartmann (1905–1963), German composer
 Oliver Hartmann (born 1970), German metal vocalist, songwriter, and producer
 Thomas de Hartmann (1885–1956), Russian composer and associate of George Ivanovitch Gurdjieff

Science and medicine
 Ernst Hartmann (1915–1992), German medical doctor, author and publicist
 Franz Hartmann (1838–1912), German medical doctor and Theosophist
 Heidrun Hartmann (1942–2016), German botanist
 Heinz Hartmann (1894–1970), Viennese psychoanalyst, developer of Ego Psychology
 Henri Albert Hartmann (1860–1952), French surgeon
 Johann Daniel Wilhelm Hartmann, (1793–1862) German malacologist
 Johannes Hartmann (1568–1631), German chemist
 Johannes Franz Hartmann (1865–1936), German astronomer active in Argentina and namesake of the Hartmann crater
 Robert Hartmann (naturalist) (1832–1893), German naturalist, anatomist and ethnographer
 Peter E. Hartmann, Australian scientist, co-winner of the 2010 Rank Prize for Nutrition
 William Kenneth Hartmann, planetary scientist
 William M. Hartmann, American acoustician and physicist

Philosophy
 Karl Robert Eduard von Hartmann (1842–1906), German philosopher of the unconscious
 Nicolai Hartmann (1882–1950), German philosopher
 Stephan Hartmann (born 1968), German philosopher

State: military, government, religion
 André Frédéric Hartmann (1772–1861), French manufacturer and politician
 Erich Hartmann (1922–1993), German fighter ace
 Ernst Hartmann (1897–1945), German SS-Brigadeführer
 Felix von Hartmann (1851–1919), Cardinal Archbishop of Köln
 Jakob von Hartmann, (1795–1873), Bavarian general
 Heidi Hartmann (born 1945) American feminist economist
 Ludo Moritz Hartmann, Austrian Jewish historian and statesman
 Michael Hartmann (judge) (born 1944), a Hong Kong judge born in Mumbai
 Michael Hartmann (politician) (born 1963), German politician
 Michael J. Hartmann, Hong Kong Judge
 Otto Hartmann (aviator) (1889-1917), German World War I flying ace
 Robert Hartmann (advisor) (1917–2008), counselor to President Gerald Ford
 Sebastian Hartmann (born 1977), German politician
 Thomas W. Hartmann, American military lawyer and director of Guantanamo Bay detention camp
 Verena Hartmann (born 1974), German politician

Economic 
  Gustav Hartmann, son of Richard Hartmann, Saxonian engineering manufacturer and manager (1842–1910)
  Richard Hartmann, German engineering manufacturer (1809–1878)

Sport
 Gerhard Hartmann (born 1955), Austrian long-distance runner
 Karel Hartmann, Czech ice hockey player and official
 Robert Hartmann (referee) (born 1979)
 Waldemar Hartmann, (1948), German sports journalist

Fictional characters 
 Erica Hartmann, a character from the anime/manga series Strike Witches
 Ursula Hartmann, a character from the anime/manga series Strike Witches
 Gunnery Sergeant Hartmann, a character from Stanley Kubrick's movie Full Metal Jacket
 Henri Hartmann, a character from a DnD campaign Halls of Ivy

See also
 Hartmann (crater)
 Hartmann Schedel of Nuremberg (1440–1514), German physician, humanist, historian, cartographer and printer
 Hartmann House Preparatory School, an independent preparatory school for boys in Harare, Zimbabwe
 Hartmann Neuron, innovative synthesizer
 Hartmann's Solution, a solution for intravenous administration
 Hartmann's operation
 Hartmann number, ratio of electromagnetic force to the viscous force
 Hartmann pipeline, a Unix software pipeline named after John Hartmann, Danish engineer
 Brødrene Hartmann, a Danish public corporation
 Hartman, anglicized form of Hartmann

References

German-language surnames
Jewish surnames